The eighth National Assembly of Armenia was elected at the 2021 Armenian parliamentary election. The President of the National Assembly of Armenia of the session is Alen Simonyan.

Vice speakers 

 Ruben Rubinyan
 Hakob Arshakyan

Composition 
This list contains all 107 elected MPs.

See also 

 Government of Armenia
 Politics of Armenia

References 

Members of the National Assembly (Armenia) by term
2021 establishments in Armenia
Armenia
National Assembly of Armenia